Arab Times is the first English-language newspaper published in independent Kuwait.

History
The Arab Times was started in 1977 by Dar Al-Seyassah as a weekly publication, and was soon transferred into a daily newspaper, playing a remarkable role in Kuwait and the Persian Gulf area. The paper is based in Al Shuwaikh. Its 2001 circulation was reported by the paper to be 48,000.

The current editor-in-chief of the daily is Ahmed Al-Jarallah.

See also
 List of newspapers in Kuwait

References

1977 establishments in Kuwait
English-language newspapers published in Arab countries
Mass media in Shuwaikh Port
Newspapers established in 1977
Kuwait